Siphonoperla torrentium is a species of stoneflies in the family Chloroperlidae.

Subspecies
Subspecies include:
Siphonoperla torrentium italica (Aubert, 1953)
Siphonoperla torrentium transsylvanica (Kis, 1963)
Siphonoperla torrentium torrentium (Pictet, F.J., 1841)

Distribution
This species is present in most of Europe (Austria, Belgium, Bosnia and Herzegovina, Great Britain, Croatia, Czech Republic, Finland, France, Germany, Hungary, Ireland, Italy, Republic of North Macedonia, Poland, Portugal, Slovakia, Spain, Switzerland, The Netherlands, Ukraine and former Yugoslavia) and in North America.

Description

Biology
This species of stoneflies has one generation a year (univoltine). They are yellowish to light brown in color and show clear bristles throughout. There are dark spots on the head and pronotum. The pronotum is transversely oval and has long bristles. Tracheal gills are not present. They can be found in streams and small rivers. They have a predatory diet, while adults feed on pollen.

Bibliography
Costello, M.J, 1988, A Review of the Distribution of Stoneflies (Insecta, Plecoptera) in Ireland, Proceedings of the Royal Irish Academy, 88B: 1-22
Hynes, H.B.N., 1958, A key to the adults and nymphs of the British stoneflies (Plecoptera) with notes on their ecology and distribution.
Marten in Landolt & Sartori [Ed.] (1997) Ephemeroptera and Plecoptera of the River Danube in BAden-Wurttemberg (Germany), Ephemeroptera & Plecoptera. Biology-Ecology-Systematics. Proceedings of the Eighth International Conference on Ephemeroptera and the Twelfth International Symposium on Plecoptera held in August 1995 in Lausanne, MTL - Mauron + Tinguely & Lachat SA, Fribourg 167-174
Wise, E.J & O'Connor, J.P, 1997, Observations on the distribution and relative abundance of the Ephemeroptera and Plecoptera in the Killarney Valley. Landolt, P and Sartori, M (eds), Ephemeroptera and plecoptera: Biology-Ecology-Systematics, 175-179. MTL,

References

Chloroperlidae